The Chli Spannort is a mountain of the Uri Alps, located between Engelberg and Meien, in the canton of Uri. It lies south-west of the Gross Spannort.

References

External links
 Chli Spannort on Hikr

Mountains of the Alps
Alpine three-thousanders
Mountains of Switzerland
Mountains of the canton of Uri